Adams County is a rural county in the state of Idaho. As of the 2020 census, the county had a population of 4,379, making it the fifth-least populous county in Idaho. The county seat and largest city is Council. Established in 1911, the county was named for second U.S. President John Adams.

Adams County is home to the Brundage Mountain ski area, northeast of New Meadows, and the Little Ski Hill, just west of McCall.

Geography
The west boundary line of Adams County abuts the east line of the state of Oregon, across the Snake River. 

Adjacent counties

Idaho County - north
Valley County - east
Gem County - southeast
Washington County - south
Baker County, Oregon - southwest
Wallowa County, Oregon - northwest

Highways
 - US 95
 - SH-55 - Payette River Scenic Byway

National protected areas
 Hells Canyon National Recreation Area (part)
 Payette National Forest (part)

Demographics

2000 census
As of the 2000 United States Census, there were 3,476 people, 1,421 households, and 1,031 families in the county. The population density was 2.5 people per square mile (1.0/km2). There were 1,982 housing units at an average density of 2 per square mile (1/km2). The racial makeup of the county was 96.29% White, 1.41% Native American, 0.14% Asian, 0.06% Black or African American,  0.03% Pacific Islander, 0.92% from other races, and 1.15% from two or more races. 1.55% of the population were Hispanic or Latino of any race. 25.6% were of American, 17.9% German, 11.8% English and 7.0% Irish ancestry.

There were 1,421 households, out of which 28.00% had children under the age of 18 living with them, 63.30% were married couples living together, 5.70% had a female householder with no husband present, and 27.40% were non-families. 23.20% of all households were made up of individuals, and 9.90% had someone living alone who was 65 years of age or older. The average household size was 2.42 and the average family size was 2.83.

The county population contained 23.90% under the age of 18, 4.60% from 18 to 24, 22.60% from 25 to 44, 32.70% from 45 to 64, and 16.10% who were 65 years of age or older. The median age was 44 years. For every 100 females, there were 105.40 males. For every 100 females age 18 and over, there were 102.10 males.

The median income for a household in the county was $28,423, and the median income for a family was $32,335. Males had a median income of $29,097 versus $14,408 for females. The per capita income for the county was $14,908. About 11.70% of families and 15.10% of the population were below the poverty line, including 16.90% of those under age 18 and 11.70% of those age 65 or over.

2010 census
As of the 2010 United States Census, there were 3,976 people, 1,748 households, and 1,185 families in the county. The racial makeup of the county was 96.1% white, 1.0% American Indian, 0.4% Asian, 0.1% Pacific islander, 0.1% black or African American, 0.7% from other races, and 1.7% from two or more races. Those of Hispanic or Latino origin made up 2.4% of the population. In terms of ancestry, 26.3% were German, 18.0% were English, 14.6% were Irish, and 4.9% were American.

Of the 1,748 households, 22.3% had children under the age of 18 living with them, 58.6% were married couples living together, 5.8% had a female householder with no husband present, 32.2% were non-families, and 26.8% of all households were made up of individuals. The average household size was 2.26 and the average family size was 2.70. The median age was 50.0 years.

The median income for a household in the county was $36,004 and the median income for a family was $45,590. Males had a median income of $31,050 versus $26,413 for females. The per capita income for the county was $22,730. About 8.8% of families and 12.4% of the population were below the poverty line, including 13.5% of those under age 18 and 13.5% of those age 65 or over.

Communities

Cities
 Council
 New Meadows

Unincorporated communities

 Alpine
 Bear
 Beer Bottle Crossing
 Cuprum
 Devils Ladder
 Fruitvale
 Glendale
 Goodrich
 Helena
 Indian Valley
 Meadows
 Mesa
 Pine Ridge
 Starkey
 Tamarack - (not Tamarack Resort in Valley Co.)
 Wildhorse
 Woodland

Population ranking
The population ranking of the following table is based on the 2010 census of Adams County.

† county seat

Politics
Since a certain time this county has been Republican.

See also

National Register of Historic Places listings in Adams County, Idaho
Rock Flat Placer
Rock Flat Mine

References

External links
 Adams County official website
 Adams County Assessor Parcel Map
 The Adams County Record - local newspaper
 Brundage Mountain ski area

 
1911 establishments in Idaho
Populated places established in 1911